Donald Earl Rives (born August 30, 1951) is a former professional American football player who played linebacker for five seasons for the Chicago Bears.
Rives attended Texas Tech University and played under coach Jim Carlen, graduating in 1974. He was inducted into the Red Raider Athletic Hall of Honor in 2006. He was named second-team All American in 1972.

References

1951 births
Living people
People from Wheeler, Texas
Players of American football from Texas
American football linebackers
Texas Tech Red Raiders football players
Chicago Bears players
People from Cochran County, Texas